Swami Akhilananda was born on 25 February 1894 as Nirode Chandra Sanyal in Netrakona in British India (now in Bangladesh).

At the age of 25, Akhilananda joined the Ramakrishna Order, he was initiated by Swami Brahmananda, a direct disciple of Sri Ramakrishna. In November 1926, he went to Boston to assist Swami Paramananda. He established the Vedanta Society of Providence in 1928 and the Ramakrishna Vedanta Society of Boston in 1941.

Akhilanaanda wrote several books, including Hindu Psychology, Its Meaning for the West. This book had a significant impact on the inter-faith dialogue of the US of that time. In his review, Seward Hiltner wrote about the methods described in the book: "These methods, and the conceptions which underlie them, revolve about 'how lower human propensities can be transformed into higher qualities'."  Concluding his review, he said, "This is a fascinating book. But we should not be beguiled into overlooking the extent to which its fundamental assumptions clash with our best understanding of the Christian view of life."

Akhilananda also authored the Hindu View of Christ, which fostered greater understanding of the teachings of Jesus from the standpoint of Vedanta. Jan Jongeneel has highlighted these intersections while referring to Akhilananda's Hindu View of Christ alongside works of a number of other swamis of the Ramakrishna Mission. In addition Akhilananda maintained longstanding personal friendships with Edgar S. Brightman and Walter George Muelder, both prominent American philosophers and Christian theologians in the Methodist tradition.

Akhilananda died on 23 September 1962.

Works
Hindu Psychology, Its Meaning for the West, Introduction by Gordon Allport, Routledge, New York, 2000.  .
Hindu View of Christ, Branden Books, 1949.
Modern Problems and Religion, Bruce Humphries, 1964..
 Time and Eternity: The Vedantic Viewpoint, Journal of Bible and Religion, Vol. 27, No. 2 (Apr., 1959), pp. 114–117. https://www.jstor.org/stable/1459971. (Retrieved 2017-2-8)
 Mysticism and Altruism, Journal of the American Academy of Religion,  (1948) XVI (2): 89–93.(Retrieved 2017-2-8)

References

20th-century Hindu religious leaders
20th-century Hindu philosophers and theologians
Monks of the Ramakrishna Mission
Indian religious writers
Bengali Hindus
20th-century Indian non-fiction writers
1894 births
1962 deaths